Cornufer mamusiorum is a species of frog in the family Ceratobatrachidae. It is endemic to the central Nakanai Mountains in New Britain, Papua New Guinea. The specific name mamusiorum refers to the Mamusi, a local tribe.

Description
Adult males measure  in snout–vent length; females are unknown. The snout is barely protruding beyond the lower jaw, with its extreme tip bluntly pointed in dorsal view, rounding to vertical in lateral view. The tympanum is visible, not concealed by the slight supra-tympanic fold. The fingers have greatly expanded terminal discs. The toes have moderately expanded terminal discs and very rudimentary webbing. Skin is smooth. The upper parts of the body are yellowish-green, becoming more greenish anteriorly, and have fine dark brown reticulation intermixed with melanic blotches; some specimens have yellow spots. The ventrum is light yellowish-green, fading to pinkish-brown in the groin. The iris十dirty mustard yellow above and darker yellowish-brown below.

Habitat and conservation
The forest floor is covered by a thick, moss-covered layer of leaf litter and decaying branches. The species is presumed to occur more widely in high elevation forests above approx.  in the Nakanai Range, possibly even wider. Although common in its native habitat, it is considered vulnerable due to its very limited distribution. Main threats include habitat loss because of logging, as well as invasive species and diseases.

References

mamusiorum
Amphibians of Papua New Guinea
Endemic fauna of Papua New Guinea
Amphibians described in 2004
Taxonomy articles created by Polbot